Wythe County Poorhouse Farm is a historic poor farm complex located at Wytheville, Wythe County, Virginia. The poor farm was established in 1858, and remained in operation until 1957. It was the second poor farm in Wythe County; the first was in operation from 1825 to 1858. The property includes the contributing Queen Anne style overseer's house (c. 1890s), eight pauper homes (c. 1858), a shed (c. 1920), a spring house (c. 1858), smokehouse (c. 1858), wash house (c. 1858), and chicken coop (c. 1900). The property is open to the public for visitation and historical interpretation.

It was listed on the National Register of Historic Places in 2000.

References

External links
"Wythe County Poorhouse Farm," The Mountain Laurel: The Journal of Mountain Life, January 2001.

Poor farms
Farms on the National Register of Historic Places in Virginia
Government buildings on the National Register of Historic Places in Virginia
Queen Anne architecture in Virginia
Houses completed in 1890
Buildings and structures in Wythe County, Virginia
National Register of Historic Places in Wythe County, Virginia